The Maritime Search and Security Operations Team is the special forces command of the Turkish Coast Guard. Formerly name DAGOT was abolished and later became SÖH Maritime Search and Security Operations Team or also called Coast Guard Special Operations Team as well.
They ensure security in Turkey's territorial waters, coasts and inland waters and prevent crime. They are in charge of providing security in search and rescue operations in the open seas and organizing drug and terrorist operations in line with the orders given. They receive training on SCUBA diving, parachuting, combat swimming, ship capture and confiscation, and special operations.
In 2016, Turkish Coast Guard units carried out operations in international waters for the first time with 2 corvettes and 1 Coast Guard aircraft. The name of the operation was Operation Albatross during which 13.6 tons of cannabis were seized and 9 Syrian nationals were caught on a Bolivia-flagged ship named Jaudi, which was sailing from the west of the island of Cyprus to the Libyan coast. 1 Coast Guard Special Operations team participated in the operation.

See also 
 Coast Guard Command (Turkey)

References

Coast Guard Command (Turkey)
Special forces of Turkey